Sheila Ellison is an American author and a speaker on issues relating to parenting and relationships.

Biography 
Ellison appeared on CBS News in 2002 as a relationship consultant. In the same year, her book, The Courage to Love Again, was favorably reviewed by Publishers Weekly.

Publications

Activity and child-rearing books
365 Games Babies Play
365 Games Toddlers Play, Nov 2003
365 Days Of Creative Play (with Judith Gray), April 1995
365 Afterschool Activities
365 Foods Kids Love to Eat(with Judith Gray), July 2001
365 Ways to Raise Great Kids (with Barbara Ann Barnett), September 1998
365 Games Smart Babies Play (with Susan Ferdinandi), June 2005
365 Smart Afterschool Activities (with Judith Gray), September 2005
365 Games Smart Toddlers Play, April 2006
365 Ways To Raise Confident Kids

Self-help and relationship books
The Courage to be a Single Mother
Becoming Whole Again after Divorce
The Courage to Love Again
Creating Happy, Healthy Relationships after Divorce
How Does She Do It? 101 Life Lessons from One Mother to Another

As editor
If Women Ruled the World, September 2004

References

External links

American children's writers
American self-help writers
Year of birth missing (living people)
Living people
University of Southern California alumni
American women children's writers
21st-century American women writers
American women non-fiction writers
21st-century American non-fiction writers